Alphaeus is a man mentioned in the New Testament as the father of two of the Twelve Apostles.

Alphaeus may also refer to:

 Alphaeus and Zacchaeus, 4th-century Christian martyrs
 Alphaeus Philemon Cole (1876–1988), American artist, engraver and etcher
 Alphaeus Patterson (1856–1931), Canadian politician and businessman
 Alphaeus Zulu (1905–1987), South African Anglican bishop

See also
 Alpheus (disambiguation)
 Capys alphaeus, a butterfly